Khao mu daeng (lit.: 'red-pork rice') is Thai dish, the local variant of char siew with rice (pinyin: chā shāo fàn) of Chinese cuisine.

Khao mu daeng is an individual dish made of steamed rice, topped with red pork, kun chiang, half boiled duck eggs (or half spiced corned eggs), and crispy fried streaky pork; served with sliced cucumbers and green shallots; and covered with sweet bean gravy. The dipping sauces are black soy sauce and chili vinegar, while nam phrik phao (Thai roasted chili paste) is optional.

It is merely khao mu daeng without red pork.

Both khao mu daeng and khao mu krop are dishes that can be found easily, either on street sides, food courts, marketplaces or at various restaurants like other individual rice dishes such as khao man kai, khao kha mu and khao na pet.

In Bangkok, there are many well-known khao mu daeng restaurants in various neighbourhoods such as Si Lom, Talat Phlu, Wat Trai Mit, Thanon Plaeng Nam, and Sam Phraeng.

References

Pork dishes
Street food
Chinese-Thai culture
Thai rice dishes
Chinese cuisine outside China